Jog River is a river in Ratnagiri district of Maharashtra.  The river has its origin in the Sahyadri ranges and flows westward near the town Dapoli and meets the Arabian Sea near Anjarle.

References

Rivers of Maharashtra
Ratnagiri district
Rivers of the Western Ghats